OPS-12 is a shipborne long range air search 3D radar adopting passive electronically scanned array (PESA) technology. It was one of the first PESA radars employed on an operational warship, introduced in 1980 by the Japan Maritime Self-Defense Force.

See also 
 AN/SPS-52

Military radars of Japan
Naval radars
Military equipment introduced in the 1980s